The 2022 Ontario Scotties Tournament of Hearts, the provincial women's curling championship for Southern Ontario was held April 7 to 10, 2022 at the Thornhill Club in Thornhill, Ontario.

The event was originally going to be held from January 5 to 9 2022, but on January 3, following new COVID-19 regulations implemented by the province, CurlON decided to suspend the event. The winning team would have represented Ontario at the 2022 Scotties Tournament of Hearts in Thunder Bay, Ontario, to be held January 28 to February 6 2022.

On January 7, CurlON announced that Team Rachel Homan would represent Ontario at the 2022 Scotties Tournament of Hearts, unless Homan is chosen to represent Canada in mixed doubles at the 2022 Winter Olympics, with a plan to hold the provincial championship in April 2022. Homan was chosen to play in the Olympics, so Team Hollie Duncan was chosen to represent Ontario instead. Instead, Team Homan (without Homan herself), skipped by normal third Emma Miskew will play at the national Tournament of Hearts as Team Wild Card #3. 

On January 19, CurlON announced that the provincial championship would be rescheduled for April 7 to 10, and that the winner will earn a bye to the 2023 Ontario Scotties Tournament of Hearts, and that there would be a purse of $15,000 for the event.

Qualification process
Eight teams qualified, two from a cash spiel qualifier, three from an open qualifier, the southern Ontario team with the best record at the 2021 Canadian Olympic Curling Trials, the top southern Ontario team in the CTRS standings (December 1, 2021), and one from the "Trillium Tour Series", the top team from a series of Ontario Curling Tour events.

Teams
The team lineups are as follows: 

* Middaugh replacing regular skip Hollie Duncan

Round robin standings
Final round robin standings

Round robin results
All draws are listed in Eastern Time (UTC−05:00). Games were 8 ends rather than the typical 10.

Draw 1
Thursday, April 7, 2:30 pm

Draw 2
Thursday, April 7, 8:00 pm

Draw 3
Friday, April 8, 9:30 am

Draw 4
Friday, April 8, 2:30 pm

Draw 5
Friday, April 8, 7:30 pm

Draw 6
Saturday, April 9, 9:30 am

Draw 7
Saturday, April 9, 3:30 pm

Playoffs

Semifinal
Sunday, April 10, 9:00 am

Final
Sunday, April 10, 2:00 pm

Qualification

Cash Spiel #1
December 3–5, Missisaugua Golf and Country Club, Missisauga

Open qualifier
December 18–19, 2021, Guelph Curling Club, Guelph

References

Thornhill, Ontario
Ontario Scotties Tournament of Hearts
Ontario Scotties Tournament of Hearts
Ontario Scotties Tournament of Hearts
Sport in Vaughan
Sports events postponed due to the COVID-19 pandemic